Oedemasia concinna, the red-humped caterpillar,  is a moth of the family Notodontidae. It is found from southern Canada to Florida and California, and in South Asia.

The larvae feed on a wide range of woody plants.

External links
Images
Bug Guide

Notodontidae
Moths of North America